The 1989 European Cup was the 12th edition of the European Cup of athletics.

The "A" Finals were held in Gateshead, Great Britain. The first two teams qualified for the 1989 IAAF World Cup.

"A" Final
Held on 5 and 6 August in Gateshead, United Kingdom

Team standings

East and West Germany competed separately for the last time being replaced by the unified German team from the 1991 edition. As a result, only one team had to be relegated from the "A" Final and two teams were promoted from the "B" Final.

Results summary

Men's events

Women's events

"B" Final
Both "B" finals held on 5 and 6 August

Men
Held in Brussels, Belgium

Women
Held in Strasbourg, France

Because of the 1990 reunification of Germany there was an extra spot in the highest division in 1991. Because of that, two teams were promoted from the "B" Finals.

"C" Finals
All "C" finals held on 5 and 6 August

Men

"C1" Final
Held in Copenhagen, Denmark

"C2" Final
Held in Dublin, Ireland

Women

"C1" Final
Held in Copenhagen, Denmark

"C2" Final
Held in Dublin, Ireland

References

External links
European Cup results (Men) from GBR Athletics
European Cup results (Women) from GBR Athletics

European Cup (athletics)
European Cup
European Cup
International athletics competitions hosted by England
Sport in Gateshead